Sarah Whitley (née Robinson, 1816 – 24 October 1888) is credited as the earliest known born woman ever to appear in a film, with Pope Leo XIII (filmed in 1896) being born in 1810. She was the mother-in-law of cinematic pioneer Louis Le Prince and was filmed by him 10 days before her death, aged 72.

In the film, Roundhay Garden Scene, Whitley is seen walking or dancing backwards.

She and her husband Joseph, who also appears in the film, were the parents of Le Prince's wife, Elizabeth. The film was shot in their garden at Oakwood Grange, Roundhay, Leeds, on 14 October 1888.

Whitley's death on 24 October 1888, is commemorated by a gravestone in the churchyard of St John's Church, Roundhay.

Her appearance in the film, and her death 10 days later, help to substantiate Roundhay Garden Scene as the oldest surviving film in existence.

She is the earliest known born woman ever to appear in a film, and also the first known person who had appeared in a film to die.

References

External links 

 
 
 Roundhay Garden Scene on YouTube

People from Leeds
1816 births
1888 deaths
Cinema pioneers
Women film pioneers